Mikhail Bogdanovich Fedak (born 6 April 2001) is a Russian football player. He plays for FC Nosta Novotroitsk.

Club career
He made his debut in the Russian Football National League for FC Mordovia Saransk on 7 July 2019 in a game against FC Neftekhimik Nizhnekamsk.

References

External links
 Profile by Russian Football National League
 
 

2001 births
People from Saransk
Sportspeople from Mordovia
Living people
Russian footballers
Association football midfielders
FC Mordovia Saransk players
FC Nosta Novotroitsk players